The following is a timeline of the history of Tokyo, Japan.

Prior to 19th century

 1457 - Edo Castle built.
 1617 - Yoshiwara (prostitution district) begins operating.
 1634 - Sankin-kōtai policy established.
 1657 - March 2: Great Fire of Meireki occurs.
 1682 - .
 1698 - .
 1707 - December: Eruption of Mount Fuji; ash falls on Edo.
 1721 - "First population census conducted (Edo’s population about 1.3 million)."

19th century

 1853
 July 8: American Perry Expedition arrives in Edo Bay.
 Odaiba island forts built in Edo Bay.
 Hanayashiki garden opens.
 1855 - November 11: 1855 Edo earthquake occurs.
 1856 - Hiroshige's One Hundred Famous Views of Edo published.
 1868 - Edo renamed "Tokyo."
 1869
 Japanese imperial capital relocated to Tokyo from Kyoto.
 Tokyo Shôkonsha (shrine) established.
 Yokohama-Tokyo telegraph begins operating.
 1871 - Esaki Reiji photo studio in business.
 1872
 Yushima Seido Exposition is held
 October: Yokohama-Tokyo railroad begins operating.
 Tokyo Nichi Nichi Shimbun (newspaper) begins publication.
 "Ordinances aimed at the civilizing of the populace are enacted in Tokyo."
 Imperial Library headquartered in Tokyo.
 1873 - Dai-Ichi Kokuritsu Bank established.
 1874 - Aoyama Gakuin school and Saint Paul's school established.
 1877
 University of Tokyo and  established.
 National Industrial Exhibition held.
 1880 - Mitsubishi Bank and Yasuda Bank established.
 1881
 Tokyo Imperial Museum built.
 Tokyo Vocational School founded.
 1882
 Bank of Japan headquartered in city.
 Ueno Zoo opens.
 1884 - Railway Yamanote Line begins operating.
 1886 - "First fixed advertising billboard in Tokyo" installed.
 1887 -  founded.
 1888
 Tokyo Asahi Shimbun (newspaper) begins publication.
  established.
 1889
 "Tokyo City and 15 wards established."
 Kabuki-za (theatre) opens.
 1890
 Telephone begins operating.
 Population: 1,155,290.
 1894 - Tokyo-fu Government Building constructed in Marunouchi.
 1897 - March: Motion picture first shown.

20th century

1900s-1940s
 1901 - Tokyo Photography Circle (club) formed.
 1902 - Industrial Bank of Japan headquartered in city. 
 1903
 Electric tram begins operating.
 Electric Hall (cinema) opens.
 1905 - September 5: Hibiya Incendiary Incident occurs.
 1906 - Harajuku Station opens.
 1907 - Tokyo Industrial Exhibition held.
 1910 - Luna Park opens.
 1911 - Imperial Theatre opens.
 1914
 December: Central Station opens.
 Taisho Exposition held.
 1916 - Tokyo Photographers Guild established.
 1917 -  active.
 1918
 Rice riot occurs.
 Neon light installed in Ginza.
 1920
 Meiji Shrine built.
 Population: 3,699,428.
 1921 - November 4: Japanese prime minister Takashi Hara assassinated.
 1923 - September 1: 1923 Great Kantō earthquake occurs.
 1925 -  begins operating.
 1926
 "Public apartment housing" built.
 NHK Symphony Orchestra and Tokyo Metropolitan Art Museum established.
 1927 - Tokyo Underground Railway begins operating between Asakusa and Ueno.
 1928 -  opens in Tokyo Bay.
 1929 - Tokyo March song/film become popular.
 1930 - Population: 4,986,913.
 1931 - Haneda Airport begins operating.
 1933 - Dai-Ichi Seimei Building constructed.
 1934
 Yomiuri Giants baseball team formed.
  opens.
 1936
 Konishiroku Honten in business.
 Japanese Folk Crafts Museum founded.
 1937 - Korakuen Stadium opens.
 1938 - Rikugi-en (park) opens.
 1940 - Population: 6,778,804.
 1941
 Port of Tokyo opens.
 Italian Cultural Institute in Tokyo opens.
 1942 - April: Bombing of Tokyo by US forces begins.
 1943 - "Metropolitan administration system established."
 1945
 10 March: A major air attack kills 90,000 to 100,000 people and destroys a quarter of the city's buildings
 August: Bombing of Tokyo by US forces ends.
  established.
 Population: 3,488,284.
 1946 - Tokyo War Crimes Tribunal begins.
 1947
 Seiichirō Yasui elected governor.
 23 Special wards of Tokyo created.
 1948 - National Diet Library headquartered in Tokyo.

1950s-1990s
 1950 - Population: 6,277,500.
 1955
 Tokyo International Trade Fair begins.
 Population: 6,966,499.
 1956 - City hosts the 1956 World Judo Championships.
 1958
 Japanese National Stadium opens.
 May: 1958 Asian Games held in Tokyo.
 November: City hosts the 1958 World Judo Championships.
 1961
  opens.
 Higashi-Ikebukuro Taishôken ramen shop in business.

 1964
 Tōkaidō Shinkansen (hi-speed train) begins operating;
 October: 1964 Summer Olympics held in Tokyo.
 Tokyo 12 Channel TV begins broadcasting.
 Hotel New Otani Tokyo built.
 1967
 January: City hosts the 1967 FIVB Volleyball Women's World Championship.
 Yoyogi Park created.
 1968
 Kasumigaseki Building (hi-rise) built.
 Ramen Jiro eatery in business.
 1969 - " enacted."
 1971 - Keio Plaza Hotel (hi-rise) built.
1971 - The Zengakuren demonstrate in Tokyo against terms for the return of Okinawa from US to Japanese control.
 1972 - Nakagin Capsule Tower built.
 1973 - Tokyo Metropolitan Library opens.
 1975
 Ward mayoral election held.
 Population: 8,640,000 city; 11,622,651 urban agglomeration.
 1979 - June: 5th G7 summit held in city.
 1988
 Tokyo Dome (stadium) opens.
 Yumenoshima Tropical Greenhouse Dome established.
 1989 - Bunkamura cultural venue opens.
 1991 - Metropolitan government relocates to new building in Shinjuku.
 1993
 Rainbow Bridge opens.
 DN Tower 21 built.
 1995 - March 20: Tokyo subway sarin attack.
 1996 - Tokyo Big Sight convention centre opens.
 2000 - Population: 8,130,408.

21st century

 2001
 10 March: Tokyo Stadium open.
 October: Asian Network of Major Cities 21 meets in Tokyo.
 2002 - Tokyo International Anime Fair begins.
 2004 -  bank established.
 2005 - Tokyo Metropolitan University established.
 2006 - Czech Centre in Tokyo opens.
 2007
 Tokyo Marathon begins.
 Midtown Tower built.
 Shinjuku Wald 9 cinema in business.
 2008 - C40 environmental group meets in Tokyo.
 2010 - City hosts the 2010 World Judo Championships.
 2011
 11 March: 2011 Great East Japan earthquake and tsunami occurs and seriously Fukushima nuclear disaster.
 17 November: Polish Institute in Tokyo founded (see also Japan–Poland relations).

 2012
 Tokyo Gate Bridge opens.
 Tokyo Skytree tower built.
 2013 - September: Tokyo chosen as site of the future 2020 Summer Olympics.
 2014
 Toranomon Hills (hi-rise) built.
 Yoichi Masuzoe elected governor.
 2016 - Yuriko Koike elected governor.
 2017
 25 November: Musashino Forest Sport Plaza open.
 2019
 August: Oi Hockey Stadium open.
 August–September: City hosts the 2019 World Judo Championships.
 October: Ariake Gymnastics Centre open.
 28 November-1 December: 2019 Trampoline Gymnastics World Championships held.
 New Japan National Stadium open.
 Hungarian Cultural Center in Tokyo opened (see also Hungary–Japan relations).
 2020
 3 February: Ariake Arena open.
 March: Ultimately postponement of 2020 Summer Olympics to July 2021 announced due to COVID-19 concerns.
 October: Tokyo Aquatics Centre open.
 2021
 2020 Summer Olympics held.
 2020 Summer Paralympics held.

See also
 History of Tokyo, and "significant events" sections

References

This article incorporates information from the Japanese Wikipedia.

Bibliography

 
 
 
 
  + Chronology

External links

 
Tokyo
Tokyo-related lists
Years in Japan
tokyo
Tokyo